The Meinong Lake is a lake and reservoir in Meinong District, Kaohsiung, Taiwan.

History
The lake was originally named as Jhongjun Pi or Minong Lake. In 1956, the lake was renamed to Zhongzheng Lake since the visit of Chiang Kai-shek, and in August 2016, the lake was renamed to Meinong Lake.

Geology
Covers an area of 21 hectares, it is the second largest artificial lake in Kaohsiung after Chengcing Lake. It has a capacity to store water for irrigation of over 130 hectares of farmland. It also serves as a fishery. The lake is surrounded by mountain to the west and fields on the other three sides. The lake features trails alongside the lake for cycling or jogging.

See also
 List of tourist attractions in Taiwan

References

Lakes of Kaohsiung